Ghada Jamal is the first Libyan television hostess to appear on a non-Libyan TV channel. Her show, Hadraza, was first aired on Jaras TV, a Lebanese television channel. Hadraza was purchased by Libyan-based Allibya TV in 2008.

Background
Ghada has lived most of her life in Libya. After attending an Al-Jazeera training center in Qatar, she headed to Lebanon to join Jaras TV, where she appeared as a television anchor. She disappeared for several months and emerged during Ramadan of 2006 with her biggest hit, Hadraza, which means "chatting" in Libyan Arabic. Her guests include celebrities from throughout the Arab world, such as politicians, performers, poets, journalists, and actors. Hadraza was aired every Monday, Wednesday, and Friday in Ramadan on Jaras TV at 9:30 pm Tripoli Time (7:30 UTC). Her show was purchased by Allibiya TV in early 2008, and is now aired every Thursday at 21:00 UTC, and rerun on Saturdays at 9:00 UTC.

Notes

References
allibiya.tv

Libyan women television presenters
Libyan television personalities
Lebanese television personalities
Libyan television presenters
Year of birth missing (living people)
Living people
21st-century Libyan women